Mykhaylo Volodymyrovych Starostyak (born 13 October 1973) is a Ukrainian former football player. He started off as a right back, but mostly played as a center back.

External links
 ukrsoccerhistory.com
 
 
 
 Russian Premier League Squads & Final Stats 2005
 Russian Premier League Squads & Final Stats 2004
 
 

1973 births
Living people
Ukrainian footballers
Ukraine international footballers
Ukrainian expatriate footballers
FC Kryvbas Kryvyi Rih players
FC Shakhtar Donetsk players
FC Shakhtar-2 Donetsk players
FC Shakhtar-3 Donetsk players
FC Shinnik Yaroslavl players
Russian Premier League players
Expatriate footballers in Russia
Ukrainian expatriate sportspeople in Russia
FC Sokil Berezhany players
FC Spartak Ivano-Frankivsk players
Expatriate footballers in Azerbaijan
Ukrainian expatriate sportspeople in Azerbaijan
Simurq PIK players
Ukrainian Premier League players
Ukrainian First League players
Ukrainian Second League players
Azerbaijan Premier League players
Association football defenders
Sportspeople from Lviv Oblast
FC Shakhtar Donetsk non-playing staff